Union Cemetery is a 19 ha (47 acre) urban cemetery in Calgary, Alberta, Canada containing about 21,000 graves. It is located in the city's southeast in the predominantly industrial district of Manchester, and is the burial place for many of the city's earliest pioneers and settlers, as well as over 150 Commonwealth burials from the First and Second World Wars.
Along with Burnsland Cemetery, St. Mary's Cemetery, Chevra Kadisha (Jewish) Cemetery, and the Chinese Cemetery, Union Cemetery is recognized by Heritage Calgary as a culturally significant historical landscape, and every summer the city offers guided walking tours through the cemetery district.

History 
Shortly after Calgary was incorporated in 1884, the town council determined that a Protestant cemetery was needed to complement the existing Roman Catholic graveyard. After initially choosing a location that was later deemed too rocky for digging graves, Union Cemetery was established at its current location in 1890. It was designed in the style of typical Victorian garden cemeteries which sought to create a welcoming park-like area for residents to visit. William Reader, the city's first Parks Superintendent, had his  residence built at the north end of the cemetery. Reader also constructed the Reader Rock Garden where he spent years determining which plants were capable of growing in Alberta soils and surviving the harsh prairie winters; seeds from this garden were later sent to and grown in gardens across North America and Europe.

The cemetery contains a field of honour administered by the Commonwealth War Graves Commission where 154 First World War casualties and 3 Second World War casualties are buried. The field of honour also includes several of the city's Boer War veterans and is the location of a Cross of Sacrifice, 25 of which are in Canada.

At the south end of the cemetery is a potter's field where an estimated 1,000 poor and homeless residents were buried, as well as several executed criminals.

Notable Interments 

 A.E. Cross
 Red Dutton
 William Roper Hull
 James Alexander Lougheed
 Peter Lougheed
 J. W. Grant MacEwan
 Archibald McLean
 Jerry Potts
 John Ware

See also 

 List of cemeteries in Canada

References

External links 

 Commonwealth War Dead, Union Cemetery
 Heritage Calgary
 Locate a Grave (City of Calgary)

Cemeteries in Alberta
1890 establishments in Canada